The Core binding factor (CBF) is a group of heterodimeric transcription factors.

Core binding factors are composed of:
 a non-DNA-binding CBFβ chain (CBFB)
 a DNA-binding CBFα chain (RUNX1, RUNX2, RUNX3)

References

See also
 AI-10-49, an anti-leukemic drug under development.

External links
 

Transcription factors